The minister of national defence (MND) is a minister of the Crown in the Cabinet of Canada responsible for the management and direction of all matters relating to the national defence of Canada. 

The Department of National Defence is headed by the deputy minister of national defence (the department's senior civil servant), while the Canadian Armed Forces are headed by the chief of the defence staff (the senior serving military officer). Both are responsible to the minister of national defence. The King (represented by the governor general of Canada) is Commander-in-Chief of the Canadian Forces and has final authority on all orders and laws for the "defence of the realm". 

The minister is responsible, through the tenets of responsible government, to Parliament for "the management and direction of the Canadian Forces". Any orders and instructions for the Canadian Armed Forces are issued by or through the chief of the defence staff. The Department of National Defence exists to aid the minister in carrying out her responsibilities, and acts as the civilian support system for the Canadian Forces.

The current minister of national defence is Anita Anand. The parliamentary secretary, who represents the minister when she is away from the House of Commons, is Bryan May.

History
On 1 January 1923, the National Defence Act, 1922 came into effect, merging the Department of Militia and Defence, the Department of the Naval Service, and the Air Board to form the Department of National Defence. The ministerial heads of the former departments, the minister of militia and defence, the minister of the naval service, and the minister of aviation were merged to form a new position, the minister of national defence. 

During the Second World War, the minister of national defence was assisted by two subordinate ministers. The minister of national defence for air was an additional minister in the Department of National Defence responsible for the Royal Canadian Air Force; while the minister of national defence for naval services was another minister in the Department of National Defence responsible for the Royal Canadian Navy. The air and naval post was reincorporated into the portfolio of the minister of national defence following the Second World War.

The Munsinger affair was Canada's first national political sex scandal in 1966. The affair involved Gerda Munsinger, a German citizen who had been convicted in Germany as a common prostitute, a petty thief and a smuggler, who emigrated to Canada in 1956 in spite of a warning card dated 1952, and who was in 1960 the mistress of the former Associate Minister of National Defence Pierre Sévigny. Munsinger was "a self-admitted espionage agent" in the employ of the "Russian Intelligence Service".

The Defence Portfolio

The Defence Portfolio is a collection of organizations and agencies that report to the minister of national defence. Although deputy heads for individual agencies direct and oversee the activities of their agency, the minister is accountable to Parliament its activities. The Defence Portfolio includes:

 Canadian Armed Forces
 Communications Security Establishment
 Defence Research and Development Canada
 Department of National Defence
 Cadets Canada and Junior Canadian Rangers
 Military Grievances External Review Committee
 Canadian Forces Housing Agency
 Canadian Forces Personnel Support Agency
 Judge Advocate General
 Military Police Complaints Commission
 National Search and Rescue Secretariat
 Office of the Chief Military Judge
 Office of the Legal Advisor to the Department of National Defence and the Canadian Forces (DND/CF LA)
 Office of the National Defence and Canadian Forces Ombudsman

The minister of national defence is also the designated lead minister for search and rescue (LMSAR) within the federal government.

List of ministers
Key:

Ministers with military experience

Bill Graham was enrolled under the University Naval Training Division of the Royal Canadian Naval Reserve and received commission as Sub Lieutenant in 1960. Graham did not serve in the Navy following his commission and thus does not have military experience.

See also
 Minister of Overseas Military Forces - communications channel for the MMD and British War Office in matters relating to Canadian military units from 1916 to 1920

References

External links 
 National Defence and Canadian Forces

 
Canadian ministers
Canada